Centro Mayor is a shopping mall located in the south of Bogotá, Colombia. It was inaugurated on March 26, 2010. Centro Mayor is the biggest mall in Colombia and the third one in Latin America.

Shops
Centro Mayor contains a variety of shops including the four anchor stores (three of them Chilean retail stores) La Polar, H&M, Easy, Exito and Falabella. Also it contains shops such as: McDonald's, Bancolombia, Telepizza, Hamburguesas El Corral, Crepes & Waffles, Baskin-Robbins & Dunkin' Donuts, among others.

References

Shopping malls in Bogotá